The Hyundai Sonata is a mid-size car that has been manufactured by Hyundai since 1985. The first generation Sonata, which was introduced in 1985, was a facelifted Hyundai Stellar with an engine upgrade, and was withdrawn from the market in two years due to poor customer reaction. While the nameplate was originally only sold in South Korea, the second generation of 1988 was widely exported.

The Sonata is currently manufactured in South Korea, China and Pakistan. It was named after the musical term, sonata.



First generation (Y1; 1985) 

The first Sonata was introduced to compete with the Daewoo Royale series and was a more luxurious version of the Stellar. It included cruise control, power seats, head lamp washers, power brakes, electric operated adjustable side mirrors and chrome bumper trims. The Sonata was available with two trim options in Korea: Luxury and Super (the latter only available with a 2.0-liter engine). In the domestic market Hyundai attempted to sell the Sonata as an executive car using catchphrases like "Luxury car for VIP"; however, as the Sonata was based on the Stellar without any major changes, it was seen by the public as no more than a luxury version of the Stellar. In 1987 Hyundai added two tone color schemes and a trip computer option, but sales soon went down and the car was discontinued in December of that year. The Sonata was sold only in the South Korean domestic market. The vehicle was unveiled in South Korea on 4 November 1985.

Engine choices included 1.6-liter Mitsubishi Saturn (only available outside the domestic market), 1.8- and 2.0-liter Mitsubishi Sirius inline-fours. The latter unit also found its way into the 1987 and later Stellar, and in MPI form the 1986 Hyundai Grandeur. The body was a largely unchanged Hyundai Stellar.

It was sold in New Zealand (right hand drive) with the 1.6-liter Mitsubishi engine with the five-speed manual gearbox; an automatic transmission was an optional extra. The original importer was a unit of the Auckland-based Giltrap Motor Group.

The final version of the Stellar was known as the Stellar 88 and was launched to celebrate the 1988 Summer Olympics in Seoul. Afterwards, Hyundai discontinued the Stellar and replaced it with the all-new Sonata.

Second generation (Y2; 1988) 

The Y2 Sonata was part of Hyundai's expansion in North America after the success of the Excel. It was introduced in South Korea on 1 June 1988. It was then introduced in Canada in September 1988 as a 1989 model, where it also entered production locally during 1989. It was presented on 14 November 1988 in the United States as a 1989 model, with sales beginning early 1989, and in March 1989 in Australia. The exterior was designed by Giorgetto Giugiaro of ItalDesign. The vehicle received a mid-term facelift in 1991. It replaced the Stellar as Hyundai's large family car. Sonatas were built in Ulsan, Korea, and in Bromont, Quebec. Hyundai and Chrysler had planned to sell 30,000 Canadian-built Sonatas yearly in the United States beginning in 1991, under Chrysler's Eagle brand. This, however, was not to be. Some Canadian Sonatas, starting with 500 cars in 1989, were exported to Taiwan to avoid that country's import quota on South Korean cars.

The Sonata was launched in Europe in June 1989, as the third model to be sold there following the Hyundai brand's European launch in 1982. It was aimed at buyers of cars including the Ford Granada Scorpio, but was priced to compete with smaller cars like the Ford Sierra.

The Sonata was designed by Hyundai and featured Mitsubishi's engineering, including the platform from the Galant Σ and its 2.4-liter, the Mitsubishi-designed engines were made under license in Korea, and had Hyundai codes stamped on them, but otherwise were almost identical to motors used by Mitsubishi  Sirius inline-four engine as used in American-market models. A 3.0-liter V6 engine based on the Mitsubishi 6G72 arrived in 1990. Other markets received 1.8- and 2.0-liter engines carried over from the first generation, but equipped with Hyundai's own MPI, replacing their carbureted counterparts used in the Y1 Sonata. The U.S. model received the DOHC 2.0-liter G4CP engine for the 1992 model year, replacing the original 2.4-liter SOHC G4CS engine.

Trim levels offered in the US:
 GL (1989-1991) with a  2.4 single overhead cam engine [G4CS], (1992-1993) a  2.0 DOHC engine [G4CP]
 GLS with a  3.0-litre V6 engine

Third generation (Y3; 1993) 

The Y3 Sonata debuted in 1993. The base engine in most markets was a 2.0-liter  Sirius inline-four, but there was a 3.0-liter,  Mitsubishi V6 option in some markets. This generation continued after the demise of the Bromont, Quebec plant in September 1993. After that, all Sonatas would be built in Korea, until the opening of the Beijing Hyundai plant in December 2002.

The third generation Y3 model was also produced as the Hyundai Marcia between 1995 and 1998, selling alongside the Sonata in South Korea only. The Marcia differed from the Sonata with its restyled front and rear fascias.

Hyundai Marcia (South Korea)

Facelift (1996–1998) 
A facelift for the Y3 in 1996 saw modifications to the front and rear. The Y3 facelift was the last Sonata produced in Ulsan.

Fourth generation (EF; 1998) 

The new EF series Sonata arrived in 1998, debuting the Hyundai-Kia Y4 platform. Compared to the Y3 predecessor, the EF grew slightly in size, but shared the same  wheelbase. It also introduced double wishbone front suspension and independent, multi-link rear suspension.

The EF Sonata shares its underpinnings with the Hyundai Trajet and first-generation Hyundai Santa Fe, which became the company's first compact crossover SUV. The first generation Kia Optima (marketed  as the Magentis outside the United States) was also based on the EF Sonata, sharing doors and roof panels.

Facelift (2001–2004) 

Hyundai facelifted the EF series in 2001 for model year 2002 as the EF-B series, revising the hood/bonnet, grille, headlights, which now resemble those found on the second-generation Mercedes-Benz C-Class, tail-lights and rear license plate location from the fascia to the trunk lid — as well as revising the dash and seats.

Hyundai strengthened the body shell and firewall, widened the rear track, included anti-submarining front seat pans and added thicker front brake discs for the update.

This Sonata continued in production as of 2002 and was marketed in China from December 2002, by Beijing Hyundai. A facelifted Sonata was produced by that company in August 2009, marketed as the Moinca. This model is only available in the Chinese market and comes with a 1.8 or 2.0 litre engine with transmission choices consisting of a five-speed manual or a four-speed automatic.

The Sonata was manufactured by TagAZ in Russia until 2012.

This model is still a common sight in Korea.

Fifth generation (NF; 2004) 

The NF Sonata was launched in August 2004 in South Korea, based on a new platform created from the project NF. The company's first all-aluminum I4 engine, dubbed Theta, debuted in the new Sonata. Engine choices at launch were a 2.4-liter I4 rated  at 5800 rpm and a 3.3-liter V6 rated  V6. In Korea, the 2.4-liter option was sold as the F24S (24 = 2.4L, S = Special). The 2.0-liter gasoline version was only sold in Korea and proved more popular there due to added gas, tax and insurance savings. Diesel versions are available in Europe, New Zealand and Singapore, where they are a popular replacement for the Toyota Comfort taxi cab.

The U.S. May 2005 launch of the new Sonata coincided with the production commencement at the company's first U.S. assembly plant, in Montgomery, Alabama.

Classified by the U.S. Environmental Protection Agency as a mid-size car, the fourth generation was  longer and taller and  wider than the previous generation. Standard features in U.S. models included anti-lock braking system/electronic stability control/traction control system as well as six airbags (driver/front passenger front and side, and side curtain).

Safety 
Europe: 2006 year models received the following European New Car Assessment Program (Euro NCAP) ratings:
 Adult Occupant: , score 27
 Child Occupant: , score 37
 Pedestrian: , score 12

In Insurance Institute for Highway Safety tests the Sonata received a "Good" overall in the frontal impact crash test, an "Acceptable" overall score in the side impact crash test, and a "Good" rating for rear crash protection. In the roof strength evaluation 09 and 10 models were rated "Marginal".

2006 Hyundai Sonata tested by the U.S. National Highway Traffic Safety Administration (NHTSA):
 Frontal Rating (Driver): 
 Frontal Rating (Passenger): 
 Side Rating (Driver): 
 Side Rating (Passenger): 
 Rollover:

Facelift (2008–2010) 

The redesigned vehicle was unveiled at the 2008 Chicago Auto Show as a 2009 model year vehicle. The production version was sold as the Hyundai Sonata Transform in Korea, and the model debuted elsewhere as an 'early' 2009 model.

The styling was done primarily at Hyundai-Kia America Technical Center, Inc. (HATCI) in Superior Township, Michigan in 2006.

The redesign features revised engines, front fascia and chrome 3 bar grille, taillights (turn signals became red in North America only), jewel-projector headlights, new 10-spoke alloy wheel design for the Limited models (as opposed to sharing the 5-spoke design from the SE model), and an extensively revised IP (Instrument Panel). Hyundai adopted "slush molding", a production technique that enables a much higher grade of texturing and shaping of the IP surface.

Redesigned gauges feature a blue backlight, and a touch-screen navigation system, optional on the Limited trim level only, includes satellite radio capability. Bluetooth capability is available as an optional unit, separate from the audio or navigation system, and all models include both a USB port along with an auxiliary input jack. An optional USB adaptor cord allows integration of an iPod, and chrome interior door handles are standard on the Limited trim.

The Diesel engine (D4EA) variant is available for the UK market with the option of 4-speed automatic or 6 speed manual, and was introduced into the Australian market for the first time, replacing the V6 option.

The base model GLS is available with a manual five-speed transmission. GLS, SE and Limited models feature a newly available, manually shiftable five-speed automatic transmission marketed as "Shiftronic".

There are minimal changes for the 2010 model, which includes the optional navigation system on the SE as opposed to being a Limited-exclusive option, and the V6 engine is no longer offered on the GLS model.

Sonata Ling Xiang 
Beijing Hyundai launched a redesigned Sonata called the Ling Xiang, also known as NFC Sonata, for the Chinese market. Production commenced in December 2008 for the 2009 model year. This variant has an updated exterior and revised rear seating. Following Hyundai's success with their Hyundai Elantra Yue Dong, Ling Xiang was created specifically to target the Chinese market. Hyundai first introduced this car to the market at The 6th China Guangzhou International Automobile Exhibition in 2008.

Engine and transmission choices include the 2.0 litre and 2.4 litre Theta engine paired to 3 gear separate gearboxes, a 5 speed manual, 5 speed automatic and 4 speed automatic. Trim levels consisted of the 2.0GL Manual and Automatic, 2.0 GLS Manual and Automatic, 2.0 DLX AT, 2.0 Top, 2.4 GLS, 2.4DLX AT and 2.4 Top.

Sixth generation (YF; 2009) 

Hyundai commenced development of the YF Sonata in 2005, with a development cost of ₩450 billion (US$372 million). In the Australian, New Zealand, Singapore, and Colombian markets, the YF is retailed under the name Hyundai i45, following the alphanumeric i-series nomenclature established by Hyundai in these markets. The vehicle was badged as a "Sonata" in Eastern Europe, just as in North America and South Korea.

Sales of the YF Sonata in South Korea began on 2 September 2009, before the production vehicle's South Korean launch. The US version of the sixth generation Sonata was unveiled at the 2009 Los Angeles Auto Show, with sales beginning in 2010 for the 2011 model year. The Sonata was the second vehicle, after the Tucson, to carry Hyundai's then-radical "Fluidic Sculpture" design language.

For the US market, the sixth generation Sonata boasted a direct-injection 2.4-liter four-cylinder engine. It is part of the Theta II engine lineup. Furthermore, a timing chain was introduced along with a new six-speed automatic transmission. This Sonata is built with hot-stamped ultra high-strength steel. In South Korea, the YF Sonata is delivered with a 2.0-liter Theta II MPi gasoline engine (Max output , Max torque of 20.2 kg·m). Its fuel economy has improved 11%. A direct-injection 2.4-liter four cylinder engine and a 2.0 turbocharged engine was available.

Exclusive options for the Korean model includes a three-piece panoramic moonroof, electroluminescent instrumentation, fender-mounted turn signals, and a special Premier Beige model. Upgraded audio uses a JBL system, and certain navigation packages come with a telecommunications system with Hyundai's Mozen system.

For the North American model, GLS, SE, and Limited trims were offered. A six-speed manual transmission came standard on the GLS, and a six-speed automatic is available. Differences with the Korean model include differences with the GLS model, which features a body-colored grille and door handles, and different steel wheel covers. Limited models and optional stereos on the GLS and SE now have "Dimension" audio systems, and the Limited trim has an optional Infinity stereo. Limited models have standard front and rear heated seats, the first such offering in this segment. Additional differences include different cupholders, a redesigned straight leather shifter as rather than the gated one on Korean models, and an additional exterior color choice, Indigo Blue Pearl. The 6th Hyundai Sonata was awarded Top Safety Pick from Insurance Institute for Highway Safety (IIHS) in the United States. The Sonata 2.0T was released in December 2010.

For the 2012 model year, Hyundai's new Blue Link system was offered as standard equipment, and the Limited model included a new standard three-piece panoramic sunroof. SE models had an optional backup camera included with navigation packages, and navigation systems included a new 7-inch display from the previous 6.5-inch.

For 2013, the list of standard features was changed slightly, including heated front seats on SE models, and heated rear seats on Limited models. An automatic transmission also came standard on GLS models, the manual was no longer offered. The GLS Popular Equipment Package now included fog lights and heated front seats. The Limited trims now no longer included the panoramic sunroof, but instead included a standard size sunroof. A panoramic sunroof offered on the Limited Premium Package.

In January 2013 the i45 was discontinued in Australia following slow sales and limited supplies. In turn, the expanded i40 range filled the gap left by the i45. The i45 has also been discontinued in Colombia, and replaced with the smaller i40 sedan, leaving Singapore and New Zealand as the only two markets still selling the vehicle under the i45 name at that time.

Facelift (2012–2014) 

In 2012, the Korean-produced Sonata received a mild mid-life facelift. Exterior changes include a new grille, slimmer LED mirror indicators, new front fog lights incorporating LED daytime running lamps (DRLs), new alloy wheel designs, as well as redesigned LED taillights. Interior changes include a new color touchscreen display for audio systems (on certain models), as well as redesigned dual-zone automatic climate controls, which now incorporate a small LCD display. A Driver Selectable Steering Mode was standard on all trims. Front parking sensors are now available on certain models, as well as an electronic parking brake. The facelifted model was first released in Korea in 2012, followed by international markets in early 2013. North American produced Sonatas received a facelift in late 2013, for the 2014 model year.

Safety 
Top Safety Pick Award in Insurance Institute for Highway Safety tests
 Frontal impact crash test: "Good"
 Side impact crash test: "Good"
 Rear crash protection: "Good"
 Roof strength evaluation: "Good"
Later release (manufactured on or after 2 July 2010) version of Model Year 2011:  by the U.S. National Highway Traffic Safety Administration (NHTSA) under 2010 new test rules
The 2011 Sonata is one of six vehicles rated Five Star under new rules as of November 2010.
 Overall Frontal Rating: 
 Frontal Rating (Driver): 
 Frontal Rating (Passenger): 
 Side Overall Rating (Front): 
 Side Overall Rating (Rear): 
 Side Barrier Rating (Front): 
 Side Barrier Rating (Rear): 
 Side Pole Rating (Driver): 
 Rollover: 

Early release (manufactured before 2 July 2010) version of model year 2011: 
 Overall Frontal Rating: 
 Frontal Rating (Driver): 
 Frontal Rating (Passenger): 
 Side Overall Rating (Front): 
 Side Overall Rating (Rear): 
 Side Barrier Rating (Front): 
 Side Barrier Rating (Rear): 
 Side Pole Rating (Driver): 
 Rollover: 

Australasian NCAP – The Hyundai Sonata scored the highest possible rating of 5 stars

Korean NCAP – The Hyundai Sonata scored the highest possible ratings across the frontal, offset and side crash tests 

China NCAP – The Hyundai Sonata scored the highest possible rating of 6 stars

Sonata Hybrid 

At the 2008 Los Angeles Auto Show, Hyundai unveiled the Hyundai Blue Drive powertrain for the then next generation Sonata, which uses lithium polymer battery technology. It was reported to be based on Hyundai BLUE-DRIVE concept.

The 2011 Hyundai Sonata Hybrid sales in the U.S. began near the end of February 2011. This powertrain is shared with the 2011 Kia Optima Hybrid; and 2013 Sonata Hybrid.

Overview 
The 2013 Sonata Hybrid has noticeable improvements and has ranked 3rd out of 20 Affordable Midsize Cars (based on U.S. News' analysis of 19 published reviews and test drives as well as their analysis of reliability and safety data). The 2013 hybrid has a long warranty and a spacious, high-quality interior. Its base price ranges from $26,445–$31,324 and weights 3450–3550 pounds.

Cumulative sales of the Sonata Hybrid in the U.S. reached 7,906 units through July 2011, representing 20 percent of Sonata sales at the time, according to Hyundai. The Sonata Hybrid was the number two selling hybrid since June, outsold only by the Prius. Considering cumulative sales in the U.S. market through December 2011, with 19,672 units sold, the Sonata Hybrid and the Kia Optima Hybrid together ranked second in hybrid sales for calendar year 2011, after the Toyota Prius, and surpassed the Honda Insight in September.

Specifications 
It comes with a 35 kW electric motor (up from 30) and a lithium-polymer battery that is 38 percent larger and more energy dense. It also retains the 2.4-liter, multi-port fuel injected, four-cylinder engine, which uses a modified Atkinson cycle achieved via VVT and a compression ratio of 13:1. Upgraded computer programming smooths the transitions between gas and electric power modes. The hybrid's  time decreased from 9.5 to 8.1 seconds (note: the non-hybrid Sonata's time is 7.9).

Standard features include Bluetooth, Satellite radio, dual-zone climate control, auxiliary and USB jacks, a CD Player, six-speaker surround system, 16-inch alloy wheels, automatic headlights, LED running lights, fog lights, heated mirrors, keyless ignition/entry, push-button start, cruise control, an eight-way power driver seat, tilt-and-telescoping steering wheel, heated front seats, and Hyundai's BlueLink emergency communications system. Additional options include touchscreen navigation, a rearview camera, panoramic sunroof, HD radio, Infinity audio system (nine speakers), 17-inch alloy wheels, leather seating surfaces, leather-wrapped steering wheel and shift knob, power driver seat with lumbar support, heated rear seat, auto-dimming rearview mirror.

Safety 
The hybrid Sonata received top five-star ratings for overall crash protection and overall side protection as well as four-ratings for overall frontal protection. Safety features include antilock brakes, stability control, traction control, front side-impact airbags, full-length curtain airbags, and active front head restraints.

Sonata Turbo 
To replace the V6 power option for the Hyundai Sonata in certain markets, Hyundai has developed a turbo-powered 2.0-liter engine that has direct injection and is intercooled. The new model is badged as the 2.0T and is available on the SE or Limited trim lines. All turbo models get standard dual zone climate control, steering wheel paddle shifters, chrome-tipped dual exhaust, and 18-inch wheels that are shared with the non-turbo SE models. Limited 2.0T models receive all of these options as well as a heated leather interior, sunroof and other features.

Seventh generation (LF; 2014) 

Originally internally coded as LFA, the 2015 Sonata was unveiled in South Korea on March 24, 2014. It made its North American debut at the 2014 New York International Auto Show. While the previous model incorporated significant aesthetic changes and sold successfully within the U.S., sales in Korea failed to meet expectations. A more conservative approach was thus taken, to appease the Korean market, resulting in Fluidic Sculpture 2.0. The car inherits many styling features from Hyundai's Hyundai HCD-14 Concept unveiled at the 2013 New York International Auto Show. The car also takes interior and exterior styling based on the 2014 Hyundai Aslan. In Australia and New Zealand, Hyundai have reverted to the use of the Sonata badge, replacing the i45 badge that was used only on the sixth generation Sonata in that market. Some cars had to be recalled in South Korea because of manufacturing defects that affected safety.

North America 
In the United States, the all-new 2015 Sonata was available in base SE, economy-minded Eco, midlevel Sport, and range-topping Limited trim levels. All 2015 Sonatas (except for the Eco) were powered by a 2.4L gasoline direct injection (GDi) inline-4 (I4) gasoline engine mated to a six-speed automatic transmission. The Eco trim was powered by a 1.6L turbocharged inline-4 (I4) gasoline engine paired with a seven-speed dual clutch (DCT) automatic transmission. Available on Sport and Limited trims was a 2.0L turbocharged inline-4 (I4) gasoline engine paired with a six-speed automatic transmission. All 2015 Sonatas were exclusively available with front wheel drive (FWD). The Sonata Hybrid did not debut until the 2016 model year, as the 2015 Sonata Hybrid was a carryover model from the 2014 model year.

All models of the all-new 2015 Sonata were well-equipped with features such as an A/M-F/M radio with SiriusXM Satellite Radio, Bluetooth for hands-free calling and wireless stereo audio streaming via A2DP and USB and auxiliary audio inputs, a six-speaker audio system, steering wheel-mounted audio system and Bluetooth phone controls, a digital clock, power windows and door locks, aluminum-alloy wheels, a remote trunk release, a color LCD driver information center in the instrument cluster, a tilt-adjustable steering wheel, air conditioning, and a split-folding rear bench seat. Most trim levels also featured a color LCD touchscreen audio system, a rearview backup camera system, a keyless access system with push-button start, carpeted floor mats, the Hyundai Blue Link in-vehicle telematics system, a leather-wrapped steering wheel, heated front seats, a power-adjustable front driver's seat, and wood or aluminum interior trim.

Facelift (2017) 

A facelifted seventh-generation Sonata was unveiled on March 8, 2017. Korean name is 'Sonata New Rise'. The exterior received a radical redesign more in line with the sixth-generation, including new headlights, tail lights, cascading grille, and optional vertical LED lighting. The front of the 2018 Sonata shares some characteristics of the sixth generation Grandeur/Azera. The dashboard was reshaped, with new air vents on the driver's side and a larger touch screen that is compatible with Apple CarPlay and Android Auto. The interior also received a new steering wheel, gearshift, and instrument cluster. Other standard features added in the refresh include standard wireless phone charger and USB port for rear passengers. The Hyundai Blue Link telematics system was also upgraded to be compatible with Amazon Echo and Google Home devices.

A mid-trim SEL trim level was also added for 2018, with standard features such as Hyundai Blue Link in-vehicle telematics system, SiriusXM Satellite Radio, A/M-F/M HD Radio, and a power-adjustable front driver's bucket seat also became available for 2018, and both the base SE and Eco trims lost those features as standard equipment.

Sonata Plug-in Hybrid 

As part of the seventh-generation Sonata, Hyundai announced the release of a plug-in hybrid variant scheduled for market launch in the second half of 2015. Technical details of the Sonata PHEV were announced at the 2015 North American International Auto Show. The Sonata PHEV was released in selected markets in the United States in November 2015. It is available only in California and nine other states that share the same zero-emissions vehicle requirements as California.

Powertrain

Eighth generation (DN8; 2019) 

The eighth-generation Sonata (codename: DN8) was previewed in early March 2019 and officially launched on March 21 in South Korea. It was also debuted during the 2019 Shanghai Auto Show for the Chinese market and made its North American debut at the 2019 New York International Auto Show on April 17 for the North American market. Despite being sold in the North American market as mid-sized, the cabin volume places it in the U.S. Environmental Protection Agency's full-size classification.

The eighth-generation Sonata uses a new third-generation architecture and uses Hyundai's latest "Sensuous Sportiness" design language which was first previewed by the Le Fil Rouge concept. The styling is less conservative and more pronounced compared to the previous generation. It now sports a fastback-like shape and features driving lights which run all the way up the hood and full-width, C-shaped taillamps. The interior has been redesigned significantly as well, with an optional 12.3-inch digital cluster and 10.3-inch centre screen.

The safety system, which comprises three radar systems, five cameras and thirteen ultrasonic sensors, allows for driver-assist features such as standard adaptive cruise control, forward-collision braking and lane-following assist.

N Line 
On September 22, 2020, Hyundai introduced the Sonata N Line.

In addition to the upgraded engine and transmission, the Sonata N Line also features more aggressive exterior and interior styling over non-N Line Sonatas (these include larger, special aluminum-alloy wheels and tires, darkened exterior trim, a special black-painted grille, dual exhaust pipes, "N Line" badging on the rear trunk lid and leather-wrapped steering wheel, red interior stitching, special interior trim, and combination leather and Alcantara-trimmed seating surfaces).

Markets

North America 
Trim levels for the Sonata are SE, SEL, SEL Plus and Limited. The latter engine replaces the previous 185-hp 2.4-liter unit. A performance-oriented "N-Line" model with a more powerful engine made its debut on September 22, 2020.

South Korea 
In South Korea, the DN8 Sonata was released with four engine options, which are 2.0-liter one hybrid and three versions with 2.0-liter gasoline, 2.0-liter liquefied natural gas injection and 1.6-liter gasoline turbo engines.

The Sonata Sensuous was released on April 21, 2021. The exterior styling of the Sensuous 1.6 turbo model is applied to the 2.0-liter gasoline model, while adding black metallic outside mirrors and a rear bumper diffuser.

Australia 
The DN8 Sonata was released in Australia in June 2021, after a two-year break of the nameplate in the country. It is only available in performance-focused N Line model with the 2.5-litre turbocharged petrol engine.

Pakistan 
On July 4, 2021, Hyundai Nishat Motors announced the local assembly of Sonata in Pakistan.

Powertrain

Safety

Sales

Notes

References

External links 

 
  (Hyundai N - N-Line)

Sonata
Cars introduced in 1985
1990s cars
2000s cars
2010s cars
2020s cars
Euro NCAP large family cars
Front-wheel-drive vehicles
Hybrid electric cars
Mid-size cars
Motor vehicles manufactured in the United States
Plug-in hybrid vehicles
Police vehicles
Sedans
Taxi vehicles